Nagaybakovo (Nuğaybäk) is a rural locality (a selo) in Novoursayevsky Selsoviet, Bakalinsky District, Bashkortostan, Russia. The population was 317 as of 2010. There are 2 streets.

Geography 
Nagaybakovo is located 42 km west of Bakaly (the district's administrative centre) by road. Batrak is the nearest rural locality.

References 

Rural localities in Bakalinsky District